This article shows all participating team squads at the 2002 Women's Pan-American Volleyball Cup, held from June 26–30, 2002 in Tijuana, Mexico.

Head Coach: Lorne Sawula

Head Coach: Eugenio George

Head Coach:

Head Coach: Sergio Hernández

Head Coach:

Head Coach:

References

S
P